Eumyias is a genus of birds in the Old World flycatcher family Muscicapidae.

It contains the following 11 species:

 Timor blue flycatcher (Eumyias hyacinthinus) – formerly placed in Cyornis
 Blue-fronted blue flycatcher (Eumyias hoevelli) – formerly placed in Cyornis
 Matinan blue flycatcher (Eumyias sanfordi) – formerly placed in Cyornis
 Flores jungle flycatcher (Eumyias oscillans) – formerly placed in Cyornis
 Sumba jungle flycatcher (Eumyias stresemanni) – formerly placed in Cyornis
 Dull-blue flycatcher (Eumyias sordidus)
 Verditer flycatcher (Eumyias thalassinus)
 Turquoise flycatcher (Eumyias panayensis)
 Nilgiri flycatcher (Eumyias albicaudatus)
 Indigo flycatcher (Eumyias indigo)
 Buru jungle flycatcher (Eumyias additus)

The Buru jungle flycatcher was previously placed in the genus Rhinomyias but was moved to Eumyias  when a 2010 molecular phylogenetic study found that Rhinomyias was polyphyletic.

References

Further reading
 Rasmussen PC & JC Anderton 2005 Birds of South Asia: The Ripley Guide. Smithsonian Institution & Lynx Edicions.
 Del Hoyo, J.; Elliot, A. & Christie D. (editors). (2006). Handbook of the Birds of the World. Volume 11: Old World Flycatchers to Old World Warblers. Lynx Edicions. .

 
 
Taxonomy articles created by Polbot